Ramila is a genus of moths of the family Crambidae.

Description
The palpi are porrect (extending forward) and slightly scaled, where the third joint is downcurved. Maxillary palpi dilated with scales and nearly as long as the labial palps. Frons produced to a rounded projection nearly as long as the palpi. Antennae ciliated (hairy). Tibia slightly hairy, with short spurs. Forewings with produced apex to a point. Vein 3 from before angle of cell. Veins 4 and 5 from angle and vein 6 from near upper angle. Veins 7, 8 and 9 stalked and vein 11 becoming coincident with vein 12. Hindwings with vein 3 from before angle of cell. Veins 4 and 5 from angle and veins 6 and 7 stalked.

Species
Ramila acciusalis (Walker, 1859)
Ramila angustifimbrialis (Warren in Swinhoe, 1890)
Ramila marginella Moore, [1868]
Ramila minima Chen & Wu, 2014
Ramila ruficostalis Hampson, 1893
Ramila thectopetina (West, 1931)

References

Schoenobiinae
Crambidae genera
Taxa named by Frederic Moore